Sarah C.R. Elgin is an American biochemist and geneticist. She is the Viktor Hamburger Professor of biology at Washington University in St. Louis, and is noted for her work in epigenetics, gene regulation, and heterochromatin, and for her contributions to science education.

Early life and education 
Sarah "Sally" Elgin was born in Washington, DC.  She grew up in Salem, Oregon. In high school, Elgin studied fallout levels in Oregon rainwater after nuclear weapons tests in the Soviet Union. She received her B.A. in chemistry from Pomona College in 1967.  While at Pomona, she participated in a summer research program at the University of Leeds characterizing the egg stalk of the green lacewing fly Chrysopa vittata. Elgin did her graduate work in the lab of James Bonner at the California Institute of Technology, isolating and characterizing nonhistone chromosomal proteins from rat livers. She received her Ph.D. in biochemistry in 1972. Elgin stayed at Caltech for her postdoctoral research, working in the lab of Leroy Hood. She continued to isolate and characterize nonhistone chromosomal proteins but started studying Drosophila.

Academic career and research 

After her postdoc, Elgin joined the faculty in the Department of Biochemistry and Molecular Biology at Harvard University, where her lab pioneered immunostaining of polytene chromosomes from Drosophila larval salivary glands and nuclease digestion assays.

In 1981, Elgin joined the faculty in the Department of Biology at Washington University in St. Louis. Her lab isolated and characterized Heterochromatin Protein 1 in Drosophila (now known as Su(var)205 or HP1a). To probe chromatin environments, her lab developed a P element construct with a copy of the white gene driven by the hsp70 promoter. When this reporter gene is inserted into heterochromatic environments, the fly eyes display a variegating phenotype, whereas when the P element is inserted into euchromatin the fly eyes show a red phenotype; this phenomenon is known as Position-effect variegation. Nuclease digestion assays have confirmed that the eye phenotypes are indicative of the chromatin environment surrounding the P element insertion site. In 2006, Elgin was named as the inaugural Viktor Hamburger Distinguished Professor in Arts and Sciences.

At Washington University, in the St. Louis area, and nationally, Elgin has been active in science education. She founded the Washington University Science Outreach program in 1989 and has been active in science education in the University City school district.

In 2002 Elgin became an HHMI Professor  with the goal to develop core curriculum to integrate primary research in genomics with a college course called Phage Bioinformatics. In addition, Elgin has collaborated with professors all over the country to improve the sequence annotation of different species of Drosophila fruit flies, especially for the dot chromosome. This project is called the Genomics Education Partnership (GEP), a consortium of 174 member colleges and universities  who participate in sequence improvement and annotation projects with the goal of publishing the results in primary research journals and also publishing data on learning experiences for students taking research-intensive classes based on GEP data.

Genomics Education Partnership 
In June 2005, Elgin held a one-day hands-on introductory workshop at Washington University in St. Louis, to show visiting faculty what her students were able to do in genome annotation. The 17 faculty who attended all signed on to a proposal to the Howard Hughes Medical Institute (HHMI) to establish the Genomics Education Partnership (GEP). The HHMI grant was funded, and GEP’s first cohort of members attended a full training workshop in June 2006.

GEP’s founding was motivated by the need to bring genomics and bioinformatics into the undergraduate curriculum, and the desire to do so while engaging students in genomics research. There is a need for substantial human cognitive effort to improve assemblies and annotate genomes in order to answer interesting questions about the role of genome structure in maintaining genome stability and regulating gene expression.

The GEP was created with these core goals:

 Introducing bioinformatics in general and genomics in particular into the undergraduate curriculum, while providing students with a research experience;
 Establishing an inclusive and open partnership at a scale that can tackle big (megabase) projects requiring many student investigators working in parallel;
 Modeling “team science” that requires substantive contributions of the lead investigator, the participating faculty, and the students, as well as expertise from colleagues in computer science and in genome sequencing, in a mutually supportive and beneficial collaboration;
 Publishing results in the scientific literature with all participating faculty and students contributing as co-authors on the final publication;
 Regularly publishing assessment results in the educational literature to contribute to the scholarship of teaching and learning.

Under Elgin’s leadership from 2006 to 2017, the GEP grew to a vibrant, collaborative, and productive group of more than 100 highly dedicated faculty, and exposed thousands of students to genomics research. While the GEP now has a new Program Director, Laura K. Reed, Elgin is still heavily involved in many aspects of the partnership.

Awards and honors 

 National Academy of Sciences, 2018
 Bruce Alberts Award for Excellence in Science Education (American Society for Cell Biology), 2006, shared with A. Malcolm Campbell
 Award for Exemplary Contributions to Education (American Society for Biochemistry and Molecular Biology), 2007
 Elizabeth W. Jones Award for Excellence in Education  (Genetics Society of America), 2009
 American Academy of Arts and Sciences, 2012

Notes and references

External links
 Sarah Elgin faculty page
 Elgin Lab website
 Dr. Elgin's HHMI Professor Bio
 Genomics Education Partnership homepage

Year of birth missing (living people)
21st-century American biologists
Washington University in St. Louis faculty
Living people
California Institute of Technology alumni
Pomona College alumni
Alumni of the University of Leeds
Scientists from St. Louis
Fellows of the American Academy of Arts and Sciences
20th-century American biologists
20th-century American women scientists
21st-century American women scientists
Scientists from Washington, D.C.
Scientists from Oregon
People from Salem, Oregon